Přeštice is a town in Plzeň-South District in the Plzeň Region of the Czech Republic. It has about 6,600 inhabitants.

Administrative parts
Villages of Skočice, Zastávka and Žerovice are administrative parts of Přeštice.

Geography
It lies on the border between the Švihov Highlands and Plasy Uplands. The Úhlava River flows through the town.

History
The first written mention of Přeštice is in a deed of Ottokar II of Bohemia from 1226, when it was referred to as a market village. In 1239, the village was bought by the monastery in Kladruby. During the Hussite Wars (1419–1434), Přeštice was acquired by the Švihovský z Rýzmberk family, who owned it for two centuries.

In the early 19th century, Přeštice was badly damaged by a large fire, but the town recovered. The construction of the road from Plzeň to Klatovy, which began to be built in 1809, contributed to the development of the town. The new town hall was built in 1832. In 1874, the Plzeň–Klatovy railway was put into operation.

Until 1918, Prestitz – Přeštice was part of the Austrian monarchy (Austria side after the compromise of 1867), in the district of the same name, one of the 94 Bezirkshauptmannschaften in Bohemia.

Demographics

Sights
The main landmark of Přeštice is the Church of the Assumption of the Virgin Mary. It was built in the Baroque style in 1770–1775 and was designed by Kilian Ignaz Dientzenhofer.

Notable people
Jakub Jan Ryba (1765–1815), composer
Josef Hlávka (1831–1908), architect and philanthropist
Milena Jelinek (1935–2020), Czech-American screenwriter and playwright

Twin towns – sister cities

Přeštice is twinned with:
 Chadron, United States
 Krško, Slovenia
 Nittenau, Germany

References

External links

Cities and towns in the Czech Republic
Populated places in Plzeň-South District